Radka Štusáková (born 22 August 1972) is a Czech former judoka. She competed in the women's middleweight event at the 1996 Summer Olympics.

References

External links
 

1972 births
Living people
Czech female judoka
Olympic judoka of the Czech Republic
Judoka at the 1996 Summer Olympics
People from Teplice nad Bečvou
Sportspeople from the Olomouc Region